Yosvani Alarcón Tardío (born October 15, 1984) is a Cuban professional baseball catcher for Leñadores de Las Tunas in the Cuban National Series.

Alarcón played for the Cuba national baseball team at the 2010 Intercontinental Cup, 2011 Pan American Games, 2011 Baseball World Cup, 2014 Central American and Caribbean Games, 2015 Pan American Games, 2015 WBSC Premier12, 2017 World Baseball Classic, and 2019 Pan American Games.

References

External links

1984 births
Living people
Cuban baseball players
Baseball catchers
Leñadores de Las Tunas players
Cazadores de Artemisa players
2017 World Baseball Classic players
Baseball players at the 2011 Pan American Games
Pan American Games bronze medalists for Cuba
Baseball players at the 2015 Pan American Games
Baseball players at the 2019 Pan American Games
Pan American Games medalists in baseball
Medalists at the 2011 Pan American Games
People from Las Tunas (city)